Molybdenum cofactor synthesis protein 2A and molybdenum cofactor synthesis protein 2B are a pair of proteins that in humans are encoded from the same MOCS2 gene.  These two proteins dimerize to form molybdopterin synthase.

Function 
Eukaryotic molybdoenzymes use a unique molybdenum cofactor (MoCo) consisting of a pterin and the catalytically active metal molybdenum. MoCo is synthesized from cyclic pyranopterin monophosphate (precursor Z) by the heterodimeric enzyme molybdopterin synthase.

Gene 
The large and small subunits of molybdopterin synthase are both encoded from the MOCS2 gene by overlapping open reading frames. The proteins were initially thought to be encoded from a bicistronic transcript. They are now thought to be encoded from monocistronic transcripts. Alternatively spliced transcripts have been found for this locus that encode the large and small subunits.

The MOCS2 gene contains 7 exons. Exons 1 to 3 encode MOCS2A (the small subunit), and exons 3 to 7 encode MOCS2B (large subunit).

Genetic disease
Defects in both copies of MOCS2 cause the molybdenum cofactor deficiency disease in babies.

Protein structure 

MOCS2A and MOCS2B subunits form dimers in solution. These dimers in turn dimerize to form the tetrameric molybdopterin synthase complex.

References

Further reading